Jan Verduijn (born 7 February 1997) is a Dutch football player who plays for FC 's-Gravenzande.

Club career
He made his professional debut in the Eerste Divisie for RKC Waalwijk on 12 August 2016 in a game against FC Emmen.

References

External links
 

1997 births
Living people
Dutch footballers
RKC Waalwijk players
Eerste Divisie players
Association football forwards